Zomato is an Indian multinational restaurant aggregator and food delivery company, founded by Deepinder Goyal and Pankaj Chaddah in 2008. Zomato provides information, menus and user-reviews of restaurants as well as food delivery options from partner restaurants in more than 1,000 Indian cities, as of 2022.

History
Zomato was founded as FoodieBay in 2008 by Deepinder Goyal and Pankaj Chaddah who worked for Bain & Company. The website started as a restaurant listing and recommendation portal. They renamed the company Zomato in 2010 as they were unsure if they would "just stick to food" and also to avoid a potential naming conflict with eBay.

With the introduction of .xxx domains in 2011, Zomato also launched zomato.xxx, a site dedicated to food porn.

In 2011, it expanded across India to Delhi NCR, Mumbai, Bangalore, Chennai, Pune, Ahmedabad and  Hyderabad. In 2012, it expanded operations internationally in several countries, including the United Arab Emirates, Sri Lanka, Qatar, the United Kingdom, the Philippines, and South Africa. In 2013, expanded to in New Zealand, Turkey, Brazil and Indonesia, with  website and apps available in Turkish, Portuguese, Indonesian and English languages. In April 2014, it launched in Portugal, which was followed by launches in Canada, Lebanon and Ireland in 2015.

In January 2015, Zomato acquired Seattle-based restaurant discovery portal Urbanspoon, which led to the firm's entry into the United States and Australia. This U.S.-expansion brought Zomato into direct competition with similar models such as Yelp and Foursquare.

In an effort to expand its business beyond restaurant listing, Zomato started its food delivery service in India in 2015, initially partnering with companies such as Delhivery and Grab to fulfill deliveries from restaurants that did not have its own delivery service.

In April 2015, Zomato acquired the American online table reservation platform NexTable, which was subsequently renamed as Zomato Book. In January 2016, it launched Zomato Book's table reservation feature on its application in India. In April 2015, it acquired cloud-based point of sale (PoS) company MapleGraph Solutions, and, in April 2016, launched its own version of PoS for restaurant owners called Zomato Base, comprising menu and inventory management, payment system and analytics. Later that year, Zomato acquired Sparse Labs (renamed Zomato Trace) and integrated the latter's real-time delivery location tracking technology on its food delivery platform.

In February 2017, the firm announced plans to launch Zomato Infrastructure Services, a cloud kitchen infrastructure service to help partner restaurants expand their presence without incurring any fixed costs. Later that year, it introduced a paid membership program called Zomato Gold using which subscribers could get offers and discounts on dining and food delivery at Zomato's partner restaurants.

In 2018, Zomato shut down operations of Zomato Infrastructure Services. The company then acquired WOTU and rebranded it as Hyperpure to supply food ingredients such as grains, vegetables and meat to restaurants from its warehouses. In December 2018, Zomato launched its annual multi-city food and entertainment carnival called Zomaland.

In March 2019, Zomato sold its UAE food delivery business to Talabat. In September 2019, the firm laid off almost 10% of its workforce (540 people) tending to back-end activities like customer service, merchant and delivery partner support functions.

In April 2020, due to a fall in food delivery and a rising demand for online grocery ordering amid the COVID-19 pandemic, Zomato began delivering groceries and essentials under a service named Zomato Market in 80+ cities across India. In April 2020, it introduced contactless dining at its partner restaurants. In May 2020, Zomato also began delivering alcohol in West Bengal, Jharkhand and Odisha after obtaining the permission of the governments in these states. In May 2020, Zomato further laid off 520 employees due to the COVID-19 pandemic.

Zomato closed operations of Zomato Market in June 2020 as demand for food delivery recovered and grocery delivery business "was not scalable". In April 2021, it pulled out of alcohol delivery service citing poor unit economics and scalability.

In July 2021, Zomato went public, opening its initial public offering at a valuation of over 8 billion.

In November 2021, Zomato ceased its services in all countries except India and the United Arab Emirates.

In April 2022, Zomato launched a pilot of 10-minute food delivery in Gurgaon called Zomato Instant. In June 2022, Zomato announced the acquisition of quick-commerce company Blinkit for 568 million.

In August 2022, Zomato launched a service called Intercity Legends in Delhi NCR that allowed users to have food delivered from famous restaurants in other cities within a few days. In November 2022, Zomato introduced Zomato Pay feature, which allowed users to make payments at partner restaurants and avail offers, and partner restaurants to promote themselves.

Circa February 2023, Zomato ceased operations in Australia, while announcing that their operations in India and the UAE were continuing.

Investments 
In November 2013, Zomato raised 37 million from Sequoia Capital and Info Edge.

In November 2014, Zomato completed another round of funding of 60 million at a post-money valuation of ~US$660 million. This round of funding was being led jointly by Info Edge and Vy Capital, with participation from Sequoia Capital.

In April 2015, Info Edge, Vy Capital and Sequoia Capital led another round of funding for 50 million. This was followed by another 60 million funding led by Temasek, a Singapore government-owned investment company, along with Vy Capital in September.

In February 2018, Zomato became a unicorn startup after raising 200 million from Ant Financial at a valuation of 1.1 billion. In October 2018, Zomato reported that it would raise an additional $210 million from Ant Financial at a valuation of around $2 billion.

In September 2020, Zomato raised $62 million from Temasek, after previously committed investment from Ant Financial did not come through. In October 2020, as part of a Series J round of funding, Zomato raised $52 million from Kora, a US-based investment firm.

In February 2021, Zomato raised 250 million from five investors, including Tiger Global Management, at a valuation of 5.4 billion.

Acquisitions 
Zomato has acquired several startups globally. 
 In July 2014, Zomato made its first acquisition by buying MenuMania for an undisclosed sum. 
 The company pursued other acquisitions including lunchtime.cz and obedovat.sk for a combined 3.25 million. 
 In September 2014, it acquired Poland-based restaurant search service Gastronauci for an undisclosed sum.
 In December 2014, it acquired Italian restaurant search service Cibando.
 It acquired Seattle-based food portal, Urbanspoon, for an estimated US$60 million in 2015. 
 Other acquisitions of 2015 include Mekanist in an all-cash deal, the Delhi-based startup MapleGraph that built MaplePOS (renamed Zomato Base), and NexTable, a US-based table reservation and restaurant management platform.
 In 2016, Zomato acquired Gurgaon-based technology startup Sparse Labs and renamed it as Zomato Trace.
In 2017, it acquired the food delivery startup Runnr (renamed from Roadrunnr when it acquired TinyOwl in 2016).
 In September 2018, it acquired Bengaluru-based food e-marketplace, TongueStun Food, for about US$18 million in a cash and stock deal. 
 In December 2018, it acquired a Lucknow-based startup, TechEagle Innovations, that works exclusively on drones, for an undisclosed amount. Zomato claimed that the acquisition will help pave the way towards drone-based food delivery in India, building technology aimed at a hub-to-hub delivery network.
 On 21 January 2020, Zomato acquired its rival Uber Eats' business in India in an all stock deal, giving Uber Eats 10% of the combined business.
On 29 June 2021, the firm acquired a 9.3% stake in Grofers for nearly US$120 million.
On 24 June 2022, Zomato acquired Blinkit (formerly Grofers) for US$568 million in an all-stock deal.

Security breaches
On 4 June 2015, an Indian security researcher hacked the Zomato website and gained access to information about 62.5 million users. Using the vulnerability, he was able to access the personal data of users such as telephone numbers, email addresses, and Instagram private photos using their Instagram access token. Zomato fixed the issue within 48 hours of it becoming apparent.

On 18 May 2017, a security blog called HackRead claimed that over 17 million Zomato user records including emails and password hashes had been stolen due to a security breach. The company stated that no payment information or credit card details were stolen. The hacker removed the stolen user data from the dark web after Zomato agreed to start a bug bounty program.

Feeding India
Started in 2014 by Ankit Kawatra, Feeding India is a nonprofit organisation which serves free meals to underprivileged people with the help of volunteers. Feeding India was acquired by Zomato in July 2019. In May 2022, Zomato claimed that Feeding India was serving over 200,000 meals every day under its Daily Feeding Program.

Controversies

"Food has no religion" tweet
In July 2019, Zomato received a customer complaint that he was assigned a non-Hindu delivery boy for his food order in Jabalpur and had asked Zomato to provide a Hindu delivery boy. The customer alleged that Zomato had refused to change the rider after which he asked to cancel the order. The customer then posted this incident on Twitter, after which Zomato responded to the message stating: "Food doesn't have a religion. It is a religion." The company's response received positive comments on Twitter, but some customers questioned the use of Jain food and halal tags on food items. According to the company, such tags are placed by individual restaurant owners, and not by Zomato.

Logout campaign
On 17 August 2019, more than 1,200 restaurants logged off from Zomato because of their offer of discount programmes at dine-in restaurants. In Pune alone, more than 450 restaurants stopped serving to Zomato Gold because of aggressive discounts and loss of business. Its premium subscription-based dining out service Zomato Gold had 6,500 restaurants partners and a total of 1.1 million subscribers in India as of August 2019. As part of the campaign, around 2,500 restaurants logged out from the Zomato Gold service. After Zomato made some changes, National Restaurant Association of India still refused to accept the modified version of the plan, saying that the corrective measures would not resolve the key issue of deep discounts. However, Zomato founder Goyal admitted mistake, became ready to rectify it and called for sanity and truce. He also urged restaurants to stop #Logout campaign.

2021 delivery partner assault accusation
In March 2021, a video was posted on Instagram by a Bangalore-based model Hitesha Chandranee who accused Kamraj, a Zomato delivery executive, of assaulting her as she refused to pay money for the food which was delivered late. She then posted another video with a bleeding nose, recalling the incident. After the post went viral, Bangalore Police arrested Kamraj while Zomato temporarily suspended him. Kamraj denied the allegations and claimed that Hitesha assaulted and abused him, and hurt herself amidst the scuffle. Kamraj later lodged an FIR against Hitesha, and she was charged with wrongful restraint, assault, intentional insult, and criminal intimidation. Hitesha left Bangalore and did not appear before the police. The police stopped the investigation as they did not find any evidence against Kamraj.

"Hindi is our National Language" controversy
On 19 October 2021, #Reject_Zomato trended on Twitter after a Zomato chat support executive asked a customer based in Chennai, Tamil Nadu to learn Hindi, falsely claiming that it was India's national language. The founder and CEO of the company, Deepinder Goyal, posted a public apology on Twitter but also said in a later post, "The level of tolerance and chill in our country needs to be way higher than it is nowadays", which further angered Tamil netizens.

References

External links
 

Websites about food and drink
Online retailers of India
Companies based in Gurgaon
Indian companies established in 2008
Retail companies established in 2008
Transport companies established in 2008
Internet properties established in 2008
Online food ordering
IOS software
Android (operating system) software
Universal Windows Platform apps
2008 establishments in Haryana
Food- and drink-related organizations
Companies listed on the National Stock Exchange of India
Companies listed on the Bombay Stock Exchange
2021 initial public offerings
Cybercrime in India